Small  Business Development Agency of the Republic of Azerbaijan (SMBDA) is a public legal entity that supports the development of micro, small and medium businesses (SMB) in Azerbaijan, and provides support and a range of services to entrepreneurs, as well as coordinates and regulates public services in this area.

History 
On December 28, 2017, the Small and Medium Business Development Agency of Azerbaijan was established by presidential decree. Later, on June 26, 2018, the agency was renamed to the Small and Medium Business Development Agency of the Republic of Azerbaijan, and its charter and structure were also adopted by presidential decree.

Presidential Decree of July 2, 2019 "On the coordination of programs (projects) financed by foreign states and international organizations to support entrepreneurship," establishes that the programs (projects) financed by foreign states and international organizations in the form of loans, technical assistance or grants for support of micro, small and medium enterprises in the Republic of Azerbaijan are implemented in coordination with the Agency.

In accordance with the Decree of the President of Republic dated May 29, 2019, on approval of the "Rules of state support for domestic market research to stimulate competitive production of/by/among micro, small and medium enterprises," the Agency carries out support measures and pays the allowances to support entrepreneurs.

In accordance with the "Procedure for financing educational, scientific, research and support projects related to the development of micro, small and medium entrepreneurship" approved by the Decision of the Cabinet of Ministers of the Republic of Azerbaijan dated September 30, 2020, funding for educational, scientific, research and support projects related to the development of micro, small and medium enterprises, as well as organization of competitions for the implementation of funding is provided by the Small and Medium Business Development Agency of the Republic of Azerbaijan.

According to the "Criteria for determining the startup" approved by the Decision of the Cabinet of Ministers of Azerbaijan dated January 29, 2021, the Agency issues "Startup" certificates to SME entities.

Support for the access of micro and small businesses to retail chains is carried out by the Agency in accordance with the "Rules for supporting the expansion of sales of products manufactured by micro and small businesses in retail chains", approved by the Decree of the President of the Republic dated December 1, 2021.

Agency activities 
The Agency carries out the following activities in the areas defined by the Charter of the Small and Medium Business Development Agency of the Republic of Azerbaijan:

 Participates in the policy-making and regulation of single state policy in the field of micro, small and medium business.
 Undertakes the necessary measures to protect the rights of entrepreneurs in the relevant field.
 Ensures the provision of services to entrepreneurs (including the necessary mobile public services) from state authorities in single space, based on the principles of efficiency, convenience, application of new methods and modern innovations.
 Monitors the implementation of services provided in houses for Small and Medium Business (SMB Houses), Small and Medium Business Development Centers, Public-Private Partnership Development Centers, Small and Medium Business Development Funds based on the principle of efficiency, transparency, and courtesy, responsibility, and convenience.
 Assesses the implementation, quality and transparency of services at the SMB Houses in accordance with the law.
 Analyzes and evaluates services provided by state authorities to entrepreneurs, and takes measures to create and improve relevant software, information systems, databases and a registry of services for their electronic implementation.
 Takes measures to create a favorable business environment in the relevant field.
 Partners with international organizations, relevant state authorities of foreign countries, and investors to explore the possibility of applying international experience, study relevant best practices, and so on.

Duties of the Agency 
The Agency implements a number of specific tasks adopted by the Charter of the Small and Medium Business Development Agency of the Republic of Azerbaijan:

 support the development of entrepreneurship;
 analyze the development trends of entrepreneurship in the country, draft proposals to enhance the role and the share of entrepreneurs in meeting the economic and social needs;
 participate in the design and execution of the main directions, general terms, forms and mechanisms of state support for entrepreneurs;
 act as an authorized body to protect the business interests of entrepreneurs and expeditiously solve their problems;
 coordinate the activities of public and private institutions in the relevant field and implement joint initiatives;
 engage entrepreneurs in the discussions of legislative acts prepared in the relevant field;
 provide training, consultancy, information, as well as assist with the participation in international exchange programs, and support entrepreneurs through additional services to enable them to raise competence, knowledge, and skills;
 support the registration of startups and the patenting of their innovative ideas;
 take joint measures with the relevant state bodies to encourage investment from potential investors into entrepreneurs, etc.

Supervisory Council 
The Agency is governed by the supervisory board and the management board. The Agency's activities are managed by the supervisory board, consisting of seven members.

The Minister of Economy heads the supervisory board of the Agency. The supervisory board includes Deputy Ministers of Finance, Labor and Social Protection, Agriculture, Deputy Chairman of the State Agency for Public Services and Social Innovations under the President of the Republic of Azerbaijan, Deputy Chief of the State Tax Service under the Ministry of Economy and President of the National Confederation of Entrepreneurs (Employers).

The supervisory Board acts on voluntary (pro bono) basis and is independent in decision-making.

Management Board 
The management board of the Agency consists of five members. The Board is headed by the chairman, who is appointed to and dismissed from office by the Minister of Economy in agreement with the President of the Republic of Azerbaijan. The Chairman of the Board has one first deputy and three deputies appointed and dismissed in agreement with the Minister of Economy. The first deputy chairman and other deputies of the management board fulfill their duties.

Structure 
On June 26, 2018, the structure of the Agency was approved by Decree of the President of the Republic of Azerbaijan Ilham Aliyev:

 Administration of the Small and Medium Business Development Agency of the Republic of Azerbaijan; 
 Small and medium business houses;
 Small and medium business Development Centers;  
 Public-Private Partnership Development Center;  
 Small and medium business development funds.

Strategic Road map for small and medium enterprises 
"The strategic road map for the production of consumer goods by small and medium enterprises in the Republic of Azerbaijan" was developed as part of measures taken throughout the country to ensure the competitiveness, integration, and sustainability of the country's economy. The strategic road map outlines the key areas of economic reform and the development of SMEs in the short, medium and, long term. This document consists of a strategic outlook until 2020, long-term vision for the period up to 2025, and the targeted vision for the period after 2025.

See also 
 Small and medium-sized enterprises in Azerbaijan

References

External links 
 website

Economy of Azerbaijan
Small and medium-sized enterprises